Sop Bukevski is a village located in the municipality of Velika Gorica in Zagreb County, Croatia.

References

Populated places in Zagreb County
Velika Gorica